Anolis fairchildi, also known commonly as the Cay Sal anole and Fairchild's anole, is a species of lizard in the family Dactyloidae. The species is native to the Bahamas.

Etymology
The specific name, fairchildi, is in honor of American botanist David Grandison Fairchild.

Geographic range
A. fairchildi is endemic to Cay Sal Bank in the Bahamas.

Habitat
The preferred natural habitat of A. fairchildi is dry shrubland.

Reproduction
A. fairchildi is oviparous.

Taxonomy
A. fairchildi is a member of the A. carolinensis species group.

References

Further reading
Barbour T, Shreve B (1935). "Concerning some Bahamian Reptiles, with Notes on the Fauna". Proceedings of the Boston Society of Natural History 40: 347–365. (Anolis fairchildi, new species, P. 357).
Nicholson KE, Crother BI, Guyer C, Savage JM (2018). "Translating a clade based classification into one that is valid under the international code of zoological nomenclature: the case of the lizards of the family Dactyloidae (Order Squamata)". Zootaxa 4461 (4): 573–586. (Anolis fairchildi).
Schwartz A, Henderson RW (1991). Amphibians and Reptiles of the West Indies: Descriptions, Distributions, and Natural History. Gainesville: University of Florida Press. 720 pp. . (Anolis fairchildi, p. 263).

Anoles
Reptiles described in 1935
Endemic fauna of the Bahamas
Reptiles of the Bahamas
Taxa named by Thomas Barbour
Taxa named by Benjamin Shreve